Kuopio Radio and TV-Mast is a mast in Kuopio, Finland.

See also
List of tallest structures in Finland

Notes

Towers completed in 1970
Communication towers in Finland
Radio masts and towers in Europe
Transmitter sites in Finland
1970 establishments in Finland